A cold weapon (or white arm) is a  weapon that does not involve fire or explosions (such as the act of combustion) as a result from the use of gunpowder or other explosive materials. 
Ranged weapons that do not require gunpowder or explosive materials and melee weapons are cold weapons, including: edged weapons (e.g., knives, daggers, swords, bayonets, axes), clubs, spears, slings, bows, and crossbows. Firearms, explosives (such as grenades, mines, bombs, rockets, and missiles), and similar weapons which rely on heat or burning are not classified as cold weapons but as firearms.

See also
 List of melee weapons
 List of ranged weapons
 Coilgun
 Hawaiian sling
 Polespear

References 

Melee weapons